Cyrus Villanueva (born 20 June 1996), also known mononymously as Cyrus, is an Australian singer from Wollongong, New South Wales. He is best known for winning the seventh season of The X Factor Australia in 2015. His debut studio album Cyrus was released on 9 December 2015.

Career

2015–2018: The X Factor and Cyrus

In 2015 Cyrus took part in the seventh season of The X Factor Australia. He made it through to the Grand Finale and won the show after singing "Wicked Game".

 denotes a performance that entered the ARIA Singles denotes winner

After winning the competition Villanueva received a recording contract with Sony Music Australia and released his debut single "Stone" co-produced by TMS and Bobby Andonov and co-written by TMS, Bobby Andonov and Sean Douglas. Villanueva's self-titled debut album Cyrus was released on 9 December 2015, and features studio recordings of selected songs he performed on The X Factor.

Between 2016 and 2018, Villanueva released five singles with Sony Music, before leaving the company following "Blah", released in September 2018.

2019–present: Independent artist and Had, Lost
In July 2020, Cyrus released "I'm Sorry", his first single as an independent artist.

On 5 November 2021, Cyrus released the EP Had, Lost. Of the EP, Cyrus said: "I see this EP as a new refreshed, refined project. It’s the first batch of music that I'm releasing that I've fully written and produced. I'm just so much more self-aware now both personally and creatively — [Previously], I was thrown into the deep end and a lot happened quicker than I realised. I just sat in the passenger seat, whereas now everything I do is deliberate and much more thought out".

Personal life
Villanueva is of paternal Filipino and maternal Australian descent and comes from a musical family; his father is a retired professional entertainer. His father, Isagani Villanueva, is from Cotabato City, Philippines, and his mother, Tracie Villanueva, is Australian. Cyrus was inspired to sing by his father who is a professional singer. Prior to entering The X Factor, Villanueva was studying graphic design at the University of Wollongong and performing gigs in bars, cafés and at weddings during his spare time. Aside from singing, he also plays the guitar and piano.

Discography

Studio albums

Extended plays

Singles

Other charted songs

References

1996 births
21st-century Australian singers
21st-century Australian male singers
Australian people of European descent
Australian people of Filipino descent
Living people
Musicians from Sydney
Sony Music Australia artists
The X Factor (Australian TV series) contestants
The X Factor winners